Lord Justice Kay may refer to:
Edward Ebenezer Kay (1822-1897)
John Kay (judge) (1943-2004)
Maurice Kay (born 1942)